HUFS Law School is one of the professional graduate schools of HUFS University, located in Seoul, South Korea. Founded in 2009, it is one of the founding law schools in South Korea and is one of the smaller schools with each class in the three-year J.D. program having approximately 50 students.

Programs
HUFS  Law specializes on regional law.

References

Website 
 

Law schools in South Korea
2009 establishments in South Korea
Educational institutions established in 2009

ko:한국외국어대학교 법학전문대학원